The Germanic-speaking world is the part of the world where Germanic languages are either official, co-official, or significantly used, comprising Germanic-speaking Europe as well as parts of North America, Germanic-speaking Africa, Oceania and Germanic-speaking Asia.

It includes, for example, the English-, German-, Dutch-, Danish-, Swedish- and Norwegian-speaking communities.

Over 200 million Europeans (some 30%) speak a Germanic language natively. Winkler Prins (2002) estimated the number of people who had a Germanic language as their native language worldwide to be around  500 million at the time. The majority of these were speakers of English (mostly American English, Commonwealth English, and other varieties) with over 300 million people at the time.

History

By the 1st century AD, most of what is today Germanic-speaking Europe was dominated by peoples speaking Germanic languages. These peoples were called Germani by the Romans, and the area they dominated was called Germania. In the preceding centuries, this area had expanded greatly through a series of Germanic expansions. By the 1st century AD, it stretched from the Danube in the south to the North Sea and Baltic Sea in the north, and from the Rhine in the west to beyond the Vistula in the east. The population of this area was however not entirely composed of Germanic peoples. Modern research has determined that much of the area was also inhabited by a non-Germanic indigenous population, who probably spoke a non-Germanic Indo-European language. For this reason, scholars sometimes use the term Germanic-dominated Europe for the region during this time. 

During Late Antiquity, improvements in agricultural methods resulted in a massive population expansion in Germanic Europe. During the Migration Period, the area of Germanic Europe was shifted towards the south and west as a result of a series of Germanic migrations. Most notably, there was the Anglo-Saxon settlement of Britain, which placed this region into the orbit of Germanic Europe.

Speakers

West Germanic ( 180 million)
German-speaking Europe (92.42 million)
Germans (78.3 million)
Austrians (8.9 million)
Swiss (4.6 million)
South Tyroleans (0.5 million)
Belgians (0.09 million)
Liechtensteiners (0.03 million)
Luxembourgish (0.6 million)
Luxembourgers (0.4 million)
French and Belgians (0.2 million)
Dutch-speaking Europe (23.5 million)
Dutch people (17 million)
Flemish people (6.5 million)
English-speaking Europe (65.48 million)
English (51.12 million)
Welsh (2.85 million)
Scottish (4.97 million)
Irish (5.9 million)
Maltese (0.05 million)
Rest of Europe (0.58 million)
Frisians (0.5 million)
North Germanic (20.25 million)
Swedes (8.75 million)
Danes (5.6 million)
Norwegians (5.32 million)
Icelanders (0.3 million)
Faroese (0.07 million)
Ålanders (0.03 million)
Finland-Swedes  (0.3 million)
Germans (0.05 million)

Countries

Independent European countries whose population are predominantly native speakers of a Germanic language:

 (mostly and day-to-day use of Luxembourgish, German and French are also used in some areas of life)

Majority English-speaking countries

English is the primary natively spoken language in several countries and territories. Five of the largest of these are sometimes described as the "core Anglosphere"; they are the United States of America (with at least 231 million native English speakers), the United Kingdom (60 million), Canada (19 million), Australia (at least 17 million), and New Zealand (4.8 million). English is also the primary natively spoken language in the Republic of Ireland. English based creoles are spoken by a majority of people in Jamaica, Trinidad and Tobago, Guyana, The Bahamas, Belize, Grenada, Barbados, Antigua and Barbuda, Dominica, Saint Lucia, Saint Vincent and the Grenadines, and Saint Kitts and Nevis. English is also spoken by a majority of people as a second language in countries such as Denmark, Germany, the Netherlands, Slovenia, and Sweden.

Majority German-speaking countries 
Below is a list of countries and one notable region with German language speaking populations.

Subnational territories

See also

 , where cultural clusters are defined
 Romance-speaking world
 Celtic nations
 Slavs,

Notes

References

Sources

Further reading

 
 
 
 
 

Cultural regions
Germanic languages
Country classifications